Adorable Julia is a 1962 Austrian comedy film directed by Alfred Weidenmann and starring Lilli Palmer, Charles Boyer and Jean Sorel. It was entered into the 1962 Cannes Film Festival. It is based on the 1937 novel Theatre by W. Somerset Maugham, and the subsequent play that Guy Bolton and Marc-Gilbert Sauvajon adapted from the novel.

The sets were designed by the art director Leo Metzenbauer. The film was partly shot on location in London. It was made with the backing of the German Constantin Film, which produced a number of Austrian films during the period.

Cast
 Lilli Palmer as Julia Lambert
 Charles Boyer as Michael Grosselyn
 Jean Sorel as Tom Fennel
 Jeanne Valérie as Avice Crichton
 Ljuba Welitsch as Dolly de Fries
 Tilly Lauenstein as Evie, Julia's maid
 Charles Régnier as Lord Charles Tamerly
 Thomas Fritsch as Roger, Julia's son
 Herbert Fux as Inspizient
 Hanna Ehrenstrasser as Ein langbeiniges Mädchen  
 Gustaf Elger as Stevenson, author 
 Sylvia Lydi as Frl. Philipps, massagist 
 Friedrich Neubauer as Sir Edwin, famous pianist 
 Fritz Puchstein as Edwards, servant for the Gosselyns 
 Herta Risawy as Margary, Michael's secretary 
 Peter Schmidberger as Charly Dexter, Julia's stage partner 
 Otto Schmöle as Albert, chauffeur for the Gosselyns 
 Fritz Weiss as Mr. Robinson, banker

References

Bibliography
 Bock, Hans-Michael & Bergfelder, Tim. The Concise Cinegraph: Encyclopaedia of German Cinema. Berghahn Books, 2009.

External links
 
 
 

1962 films
1962 comedy films
1960s German-language films
Austrian comedy films
French comedy films
Films directed by Alfred Weidenmann
Austrian black-and-white films
French black-and-white films
German black-and-white films
West German films
Films based on works by W. Somerset Maugham
Films set in London
Constantin Film films
1960s French films